Acacia multisiliqua is a shrub or tree of the genus Acacia and the subgenus Plurinerves that is endemic to northern Australia.

Description
The spindly shrub or slender tree typically grows to a height of  that has a prostrate habit in open coastal situation. Like most species of Acacia it has phyllodes rather than true leaves. The leathery and  evergreen phyllodes have an oblong-elliptic to narrowly elliptic shape that is usually incurved a little. It blooms from February to August and produces yellow flowers. The simple inflorescences present as spherical flower-heads with a diameter of  containing 25 to 40 golden colured flowers. The chartaceous seed pods that form after flowering are linear but raised over and constricted between each of the seeds.

Taxonomy
The plant is allied with Acacia burrana, Acacia complanata and Acacia simsii.

Distribution
It has a scattered distribution and is native to an area in the Northern Territory, the Kimberley region of Western Australia, and northern Queensland where it is commonly situated on rocky or stony slopes growing in alluvium or over sandstone or soils composed of laterite in drier areas it is usually found as a part of open woodland communities. The range of the plant extends from around Derby in the west across the top end of the Northern Territory and to around Cape Melville in North Queensland in the east and as far south as Clermont.

See also
 List of Acacia species

References

multisiliqua
Acacias of Western Australia
Flora of the Northern Territory
Flora of Queensland
Taxa named by George Bentham